"To Parelthon Mou" (My Past) is a song by Anna Vissi, and the main theme song from the Greek film Bank Bang. "To Parelthon Mou", Vissi's first new song since 2006, was released at the end of October 2008 to radios and as a digital download. It was released in November on the official soundtrack. It is included as a bonus song on Vissi's 2008 album Apagorevmeno.

Song information 
"To Parelthon Mou", was officially released on October 29, 2008 simultaneously to all radio stations in Greece and Cyprus along with its music video to MAD TV. Composed by Giannis Kifonidis, with lyrics by Giorgos Mitsigkas, "To Parelthon Mou" is the theme song to a Greek film Bank Bang which was released in December. The song was released as a digital download on October 29, 2008 while the soundtrack for the film was released in mid-November. The song is also included as a bonus track on Vissi's album Apagorevmeno.

Music video
The music video for the song was filmed on October 22, 2008 at the Mall Athens, and features scenes from the movie, while cutting away to Vissi.

Charts
The song reached number one on the official Greek Singles Chart by Billboard in its first week of release. It remained in the Top 10 for 7 consecutive weeks.

References

External links
 

2008 singles
Anna Vissi songs
2008 songs
Sony BMG singles
Number-one singles in Greece